Andrai Ricardo Jones (born 1 January 1992) is an English footballer who currently plays for National League North side Guiseley.

Career
Born in Liverpool, Jones began his career playing for youth side Kingsley United Football Club in Toxteth, Liverpool.
Having previously been part of the youth system at Everton and Preston North End, he joined Bury's youth set-up. He joined the first team squad for the 2010/11 season. In September 2010 he went on loan at Altrincham for a month where he played one game for the club on 28 September in a 3–3 draw against Kettering.

He made his Football League debut as a 93rd-minute substitute in a match with Northampton Town on 9 April 2011. In May 2011 he was offered a new contract by the club. He signed a new 12-month contract with Bury in June 2011.
On 31 January 2013, Jones completed a free transfer to Barnsley signing an 18-month contract with the Championship side. He made his debut as a substitute on 16 April 2013, replacing Bobby Hassell, in a 1–1 draw against Derby County.
In August 2013, he joined League One side Tranmere Rovers on a month-long loan. He made his debut for the club as a first-half substitute in a 2–1 away defeat at Crewe Alexandra on 17 August. He was released by Barnsley at the end of the 2013/14 season and signed a contract with Gateshead on 30 June 2014. His Gateshead debut came on 12 August 2014 against Wrexham. Jones was released at the end of the season and signed a two-year deal with Southport in July 2015. Jones was sent off on his Southport debut against Eastleigh on 8 August 2015.

On 10 July 2017, Jones joined Welsh Premier League side Bala Town. He was released in June 2018.

In October 2018, Jones signed for Stafford Rangers.

On 1 December 2020, Jones rejoined Guiseley.

Personal life
Jones founded a company offering UV football, involving a glow in the dark kit, ball and pitch.

Career statistics

References

External links

Profile at Bury F.C.

English footballers
Living people
Alfreton Town F.C. players
Altrincham F.C. players
Bury F.C. players
Barnsley F.C. players
Gateshead F.C. players
Southport F.C. players
Tranmere Rovers F.C. players
Bala Town F.C. players
1992 births
Footballers from Liverpool
Association football defenders
National League (English football) players
English Football League players
Cymru Premier players
Stafford Rangers F.C. players